Street Fighter Online: Mouse Generation (ストリートファイター オンライン マウスジェネレーション) is a  2008 competitive fighting game produced by Capcom subsidiary Daletto (a joint venture of Capcom and Games Arena) in association with Revoltech and released for the PC. The game uses a PC mouse for combat, and the characters are customizable to some degree. In addition to the established Street Fighter characters in the game, Mouse Generation also includes licensed characters based on novels, manga and anime such as the characters based on the works by Wuxia novelist Louis Cha, and one real-life person.

While Mouse Generation can arguably be considered a Street Fighter game (as the name would suggest), it is actually a crossover game (like X-Men vs. Street Fighter or Street Fighter X Tekken), and as such it is not canon to the Street Fighter universe.

Characters

From the Street Fighter series

Ryu
Chun-Li
Zangief
Guile
Ken

From Louis Cha's novels

Hu Fei ( Hiko) from Fox Volant of the Snowy Mountain
He Tieshou ( Teiran), from Sword Stained with Royal Blood
Mei Chaofeng ( Baichōfu) from The Legend of the Condor Heroes
Linghu Chong ( Reikochū) from The Smiling, Proud Wanderer
Zhou Botong ( Shū Hakutsū) from The Legend of the Condor Heroes

From Cyborg 009

Cyborg 004
Cyborg 005
Cyborg 009
Cyborg 006

From the Rival Schools series

Batsu Ichimonji
Akira Kazama

Other characters
Shin - The game's sole new character, Shin is a Japanese-Korean Taekwondo master who is following the footsteps of his father, a former Japanese Karate master, and his maternal grandfather, a Taekwondo master from South Korea, although he actually disliked combative sports preferring to be a musician or artist. He changed his mind and studied Taekwondo because he thought it was brilliant. 
Johannes Krauser II (Soichi Negishi's alter-ego from Detroit Metal City)
Gavan (from Space Sheriff Gavan)
Barack Obama - A caricature of the United States president Barack Obama was made as Valentine's Day DLC for the game. He could perform several of Ryu's special moves, but always had a floating rectangular speech bubble follow him around. This fictionalised version of Barack Obama doesn't have any specific origin, so he was the second original character created for Street Fighter Online after Shin.

Gameplay 
Fighters are controlled by mouse movements, mouse buttons and the scroll wheel. Characters in the game were apparently action-figure versions of the actual characters, using Revoltech's action-figure 3D engine. As such, fighter's body parts could be switched and customized. The character models were designed to look like the action-figure of the characters, with blocky limbs and visible joint screws. While this engine allowed for "maximum flexibility", it made the character models "revolting".

The game was free to play. Daletto's revenue came from micro-transactions, through a store, and through in-game Gashapon dispensers (licensed from Bandai). Players were able to purchase extra body parts and outfits, to further customize their characters. Some purchasable items were fairly abstract, such as squid-shaped hats, as a cross-promotion with pre-existing squid-shaped USB thumb drives.

The high number of pre-existing licensed characters compared to the low number of actual Street Fighter characters was also a source of criticism. The only original character, Shin, never made any playable appearances after this game.

References

External links
Daletto: Street Fighter Online
REVOLTECH STREET FIGHTER ONLINE
Street Fighter Online (official)

Street Fighter games
2008 video games
Online games
Windows games
Windows-only games
Crossover fighting games
Video games developed in Japan